The following ships of the Hellenic Navy have borne the name Kanaris after the Greek admiral and statesman Konstantinos Kanaris:

 Greek gunboat Kanaris, launched in 1835.
 Greek auxiliary ship Kanaris, a former British freighter launched in 1880 as Psara, used as a torpedo boat tender.
 , a  launched in 1941 as HMS Hatherleigh but transferred to Greece and renamed before completion. She was returned to the Royal Navy in 1959 and scrapped in 1960.
 , a  launched in 1945 as USS Stickell. She was renamed on transfer to Greece in 1972 and scrapped in 2002.
 , an  launched in 1981 as HNLMS Jan van Brakel. She was transferred to Greece in 2002 and renamed.

See also
 Kanaris (disambiguation)

Hellenic Navy ship names